The Surface Pro is a first generation 2-in-1 detachable of the Microsoft Surface series, designed and manufactured by Microsoft. The device ran a 64-bit version of Windows 8 Pro operating system with a free upgrade possibility to Windows 8.1 Pro, and eventually also Windows 10. Initially announced as Surface for Windows 8 Pro on June 18, 2012, at a Los Angeles event, Microsoft later renamed the device to Surface Pro, and launched it on February 9, 2013.

History 
Microsoft did not take pre-orders for the Surface Pro. It was available for a purchase on February 9, 2013, in the United States, Canada and China, and was released on 23 May 2013, in the United Kingdom and a number of other countries.

Features

Hardware 
The Surface Pro shares a lot of its design traits with its lower cost counterpart, the original Surface hybrid tablet, announced on the same day. Both have the dark VaporMg coating over the same magnesium body and a 10-point multi-touch enabled  screen with crack resistant Gorilla Glass. The Wifi is 802.11 a/b/g/n.

However, the resolution on the Surface Pro is higher and is 1920x1080, and the screen has a Wacom digitizer for pen input. Surface Pro runs a dual-core 1.7 GHz Intel Core i5-3317U CPU, with a Turbo Boost frequency of up to 2.6 GHz with a built-in Intel HD Graphics 4000. It has 4 GB of memory and a 64 or 128 GB solid-state drive. Unique to the Surface and Surface Pro is the kickstand which can be flipped out from the back, propping the device up. The kickstand comes out of the devices at a 22 degree angle, the same angle the edges of the device are angled at.

Along the right side of the device, the Surface Pro has a micro-SD card slot on top (with support for cards up to 200 GB), followed by the power port, and near the bottom, a Mini DisplayPort to connect a number of external displays. The bottom of the device (dubbed the "accessory spine") contains the cover port to attach a Touch Cover or Type Cover. In addition to the magnetic attachments, the cover port on the Surface Pro contains a pogo pin connector. Unique to the Surface Pro, compared to the Surface tablet, is the addition of power connectors for compatibility with the Surface Power Cover. The left side of the 2-in-1 contains a full-sized USB 3 port, the volume rocker, and the audio jack. The power button is on the top of the device. On the front and back of the device are two 720p Lifecam cameras, and inside is a 42 Watt-hour battery. Other sensors include an ambient light sensor, accelerometer, gyroscope, and compass.

Software 
Surface Pro originally shipped with Windows 8 Pro, but was upgradeable to Windows 8.1 Pro. The Surface Pro is further capable of upgrading to Windows 10 Pro, which became a free upgrade for users since July 29, 2015.

Accessories 
The 2-in-1 features two types of detachable keyboards: Type Cover and Touch Cover, both with an integrated touchpad. Both accessories additionally act as a protective screen cover and are sold separately. Later Microsoft introduced the Power Cover (with the Surface Pro 2), which is backwards compatible with the Surface Pro.

Surface Pro is the first device in the Surface family to feature a stylus pen input. Pro Pen is based on Wacom digitizer technology. It is integrated with OneNote software which is also included with the Surface Pro and used for note taking and sketches.

The Surface Pro includes a 48-watt power supply with additional 5 W USB port for charging other devices. In early 2016, Microsoft issued a recall for the cable used to connect Surface Pro, Surface Pro 2 and Surface Pro 3 chargers, but not the charger itself, sold before the 15th of July, 2015 due to the risk of electrical fire.

Reception 
Surface Pro received mixed reviews from the computer hardware critics. While most praised the convertible nature of the device, which can be used both as a tablet and a laptop, its design and a precise pressure-sensitive pen, the typical complaints were a short battery life, bulkiness compared to traditional ARM-based tablets and excessive heat and fan noise during periods of heavy load. Other complaints included long response times when the computer was asleep, and even sudden shut downs in the middle of usage.

With the release of the Surface Pro 4 and Surface Book, cooling issues were resolved. Microsoft engineered the computers to dissipate 60% of their heat through the metal body using a combination of heat pipes and copper sinks. The fans only activate under load, allowing the computer to run cold and silent.

Timeline

References

External links 
 

Microsoft Surface
Tablet computers introduced in 2013
2-in-1 PCs
Sealed computers